Keith Bridges (1929 – 23 February 2014), also known by the nickname of "Bridgie", was an English professional rugby league footballer who played in the 1950s and 1960s.

Background
Keith Bridges' birth was registered in Wakefield, West Riding of Yorkshire, England, he was raised in Sharlston, he worked as a miner , and as self-employed construction worker, he lived on Kimberley Street, Featherstone , and he died aged 84 in Pinderfields Hospital, Wakefield, West Yorkshire, England.

Playing career

County Cup Final appearances
Keith Bridges played  in Wakefield Trinity's 23–5 victory over Hunslet in the 1956–57 Yorkshire County Cup Final during the 1956–57 season at Headingley Rugby Stadium, Leeds on Saturday 20 October 1956.

Club career
Keith Bridges made his début for Wakefield Trinity in the 21-13 victory over Swinton at Belle Vue, Wakefield on Saturday 30 October 1954, and he played last match for Wakefield Trinity in the 14-14 draw with Castleford at Wheldon Road, Castleford on Tuesday 25 December 1956.

Genealogical information
Keith Bridges' marriage to Brenda (née Barnsley) (birth registered during second ¼ 1930 in Pontefract district) was registered during fourth ¼ 1948 in Pontefract district. They had children; Gloria Bridges (birth registered during third ¼  in Pontefract district), the future rugby league footballer, John Keith Bridges, Nadine E. Bridges (birth registered during second ¼  in Pontefract district), and Beverley Bridges (birth registered during first ¼  in Pontefract district).

References

External links
Search for "Bridges" at rugbyleagueproject.org

Search for "Keith Bridges" at britishnewspaperarchive.co.uk
Photograph 'Autographs 1958-59 - Castleford 1958/59 season. Barry Walsh…' at castigersheritage.com
Photograph 'Autographs 1960s - Undated 1960s autographs - Ken Pye…' at castigersheritage.com
Photograph 'Autographed programme 1959 - 7 May 1959 Castleford v Harry Street's XIII Charlie Howard Testimonial Match official programme front page' at castigersheritage.com
Photograph 'autographed programme 1961 - 18 March 1961 Castleford v Hull KR' at castigersheritage.com
Photograph '7 March 1959. Away v HKR RLC Cup 2nd Round lost 20-0' at castigersheritage.com
Photograph '12 December 1959. Away v Leeds lost 29-15' at castigersheritage.com
Photograph 1959-1960' at castigersheritage.com (same photograph as archive.castigersheritage.com/?d=true&i=606)
Photograph '1959-1960' at castigersheritage.com (same photograph as archive.castigersheritage.com/?d=true&i=605&z=5)
Photograph '1960-1961' at castigersheritage.com

1929 births
2014 deaths
Castleford Tigers players
English rugby league players
People from Sharlston
Rugby league hookers
Rugby league players from Wakefield
Wakefield Trinity players